The Louie C. Powledge Unit (B2, originally the Beto II Unit) is a Texas Department of Criminal Justice (TDCJ) prison for men located in unincorporated Anderson County, Texas. The approximately  unit, co-located with the Beto, Coffield, and Michael prison units and the Gurney Unit transfer facility, is along Farm to Market Road 3452.

The unit opened in July 1982 as the Beto II Unit. It was originally named after former Texas Department of Corrections (TDC) head George Beto. Construction of the bus repair facility began in October 1982 and ended in October 1984. The unit acquired additional acreage in October 1986. Construction of a 200-person trusty camp facility began in 1987 and ended in January 1989. In October 1988 the bus repair facility was converted into a manufacturer of dump beds and spreader boxes for the Highway Department dump trucks and of jail steel products for the construction of additional TDCJ units. The Louis C. Powledge Unit received its current name on May 5, 1995, after Louie C. Powledge, a former Assistant Director of Contract Construction.

In 2011 the Stiles Unit metal products plant closed. Its operations were consolidated with those of Powledge and Coffield Unit.

Notable residents
Current (as of 2019):

 Warren Jeffs –leader of Fundamentalist Church of Jesus Christ of Latter-Day Saints, convicted of aggravated sexual assault of multiple children.
Eddie Ray Routh – Convicted of murdering Chris Kyle and Chad Littlefield in 2013.

Former:
 Carlos Coy (South Park Mexican) - Houston, Texas rapper convicted of aggravated sexual assault of a child
 Royce Zeigler – convicted of the murder of Riley Ann Sawyers
Terry Hornbuckle – former pastor in Arlington, TX church, convicted of raping females in congregation.

References

External links

 "Powledge Unit." Texas Department of Criminal Justice.

Prisons in Anderson County, Texas
1982 establishments in Texas